The 1903 Mercer Bears baseball team represented the Mercer Bears  in the 1903 college baseball season. The team was coached by Cy Young.

References

Mercer Bears
Mercer Bears baseball seasons
Mercer baseball